is a Japanese manga series written by Norimitsu Kaihō and illustrated by Sadoru Chiba. The series was serialized from May 2012 to November 2019 in the Houbunsha's Manga Time Kirara Forward magazine and is licensed in English by Yen Press.

An anime adaptation by Lerche aired between July and September 2015. A live-action film adaptation was released in January 2019.

Premise
As Yuki seeks out fun school activities every day while living at school, the other girls work to keep her safe, because in reality, they are the sole survivors of their school after a zombie outbreak overruns the city.

Characters

School Living Club
The main characters of the series are a small club of girls who prioritize being able to live while inside the school.

Live action portrayal: Midori Nagatsuki
A bright and cheerful girl who is always excited to try new and exciting club activities. As a result of a mental breakdown due to the zombie outbreak, Yuki has created an idealized delusion for herself, believing that everything is normal and her classmates and teachers are alive and well. Slowly, she realizes the truth of her surroundings but still acts oblivious, though she will panic on occasions when her delusion breaks down and she sees reality for what it is. Since leaving the school, Yuki has slowly been coming to terms with reality and has tried to be of more use to the group.

Live action portrayal: Nanami Abe
A twin-tailed girl of the School Living Club, who is often sent out on the more dangerous missions. She carries a shovel around with her at all times in case of zombie encounters. She was formerly in love with an unnamed upperclassman, but when the zombie outbreak occurred, her crush was bitten and attacked her. She then used a shovel to kill him, and it has since been her weapon of choice. After she becomes infected by being bitten on the right arm by the zombified Megumi, she is seemingly cured by an antidote. However, her body remains cold and she is ignored by other zombies, suggesting that the antidote didn't work properly. In later manga chapters, she begins to display zombie-like behavior though she still manages to retain her sense of self.

Live action portrayal: Wakana Majima
The president of the School Living Club, nicknamed . She is the one who manages everything the club has. Even though she acts as a strong girl and big sister for the other members, she is extremely mentally fragile, growing more unstable as the stakes get higher. She has a younger sister named Ruu, who she believes she has rescued from an elementary school but is later revealed to be Yuki's stuffed teddy bear.

Live action portrayal: Rio Kiyohara
A blonde-haired girl who is a year below the other girls and is nicknamed  by Yuki, much to her dismay. She was rescued by the School Living Club while they were scouting a shopping mall, where she had been living since the outbreak. She initially dislikes the way Kurumi and Yuuri play along with Yuki's delusions, but later comes to understand how she helps them. She also becomes kind and soft, opening her true self to other members, and is especially close to both Yuki and Kurumi. She refers to Yuki as her senpai.

Live action portrayal: Nonoka Ono
A teacher and the advisor for the School Living Club who is affectionately called  by her students, forming the club to protect the girls when the outbreak occurred. While initially shown to be a teacher with rather little presence, often being interrupted by the other girls, it is soon revealed that she, like the other students, is another part of Yuki's delusions. In reality, she was infected shortly after forming the School Living Club, forcing herself into a hidden part of the school before completely turning into a zombie. When she is eventually found, she ends up infecting Kurumi before being put down by Miki.

A Shiba Inu puppy that was found by Yuki and taken in as the School Living Club's mascot. However, because he was infected, the girls had to throw him away when he turned, but he still occasionally attempts to get into the clubroom due to his residual memories of the club. He has an expanded role in the anime version, having originally been found by Miki before they were both taken in by the club, but is later infected by Megumi. Although he is cured by the same vaccine given to Kurumi, he is left weak from the fight and later dies.

Megurigaoka Private High School

Miki's classmate and best friend who was with her when the zombie outbreak occurred. Forced to lock themselves in a shopping mall, Kei eventually grew impatient of spending her life indoors and went outside. When the girls finally leave their school to go to college, Miki believes that she saw a zombified Kei on the way out.

Another teacher at Megurigaoka Private High School and one of Yuki's teachers. As a teacher, she was calm and kind; but due to Yuki often sleeping in class, she would get a little annoyed with her; though, she did not get particularly angry, and only warned her that if she continued, she would have to stay after class. However, she did get angry when Yuki's friends would interrupt her classes. She was also very caring, and before the outbreak, she seemed to be on good terms with Megumi, which was proven when she decided to spend her last moments telling Megumi about the outbreak and not to let anyone come on to the rooftop.

A student at Megurigaoka Private High School, and she was a close friend and classmate of Yuki prior to the outbreak. She had a calm demeanor, with a punk-like atmosphere surrounding her. Takae also seemed to have quite a playful personality, throwing paper planes at Yuki with a drawing of her depicted as an angel inside. She greatly cherished Yuki and was very affectionate with her, and she was also on good terms with her other two friends. Near the end of the series, Takae (in her zombie form) was "listening" when Yuki spoke from the broadcasting room as she told the students who were still at the school that classes were over and that they could go home.

St. Isidore University
A university in the same town area as the School-Live club. It is one of the several designated facilities in the town with survival rations, solar panels, and an evacuation shelter. Following the outbreak, the surviving students at the school became divided, with some banding together to survive (the Circle) while others descended into anarchic survivalism (the Militants).

The club president of the St. Isidore University's , also known as the Circle, a small team of women who are at odds with some of the other students who are more focused on survival. She has a collection of video games and movies that she can play using the university's facilities. She makes an anime-original cameo in anime's final episode post-credits. She left the Militants when she disagreed with their strict methods. Unlike the Militants, she does not enforce body checks for signs of infection.

Member of the Circle and like most of its members, she was a former member of Militants until she left after having a glimpse of the thrilling pleasure that Ayaka took in the zombie apocalypse. She was a Liberal Arts Major before the outbreak.

Repairman of the Circle, nicknamed Hika for short. She is quiet and kind, but was kicked out of the Militants after failing to kill a zombie by herself in fear, being deemed too weak to survive. She was an Engineering student and performs maintenance on the facilities that the Circle uses.

The bookworm and librarian of the Circle, she often remains in the school library to read books due to her love of books and rarely leaves. She was also a Liberal Arts Major before the outbreak.

An older student from the University who has been studying the infection on her own for weeks. After traveling to Randal Corporation HQ, Aosoi deduces the possible location of a cure for the infection, but becomes infected herself and dies before she is able to directly relay that information. She leaves behind notes of the cure in her cellphone, which the girls use to stop the virus.

Leader of the Militants, the more survival-oriented combatant group of students at the university. He enforces body checks on all members of the club in order to eliminate the chance of a zombie infection among them. He is often seen with a negative outlook and expression because of the stress of surviving the outbreak. He uses a nail bat as a weapon. He is betrayed by Ayaka after he is infected, pushed into a horde of zombies and burned alive to cover her escape from the university.

One of the remaining female members of the Militants, she usually is calm and without obvious emotion but secretly takes great pleasure in killing zombies and people alike, as a means of having a fulfilling existence. She is adept at using a crossbow and knife as weapons. She kills Takahito to distract the zombies and escape the university, as she believes that she will have far more fun outside the walls of the college.

The other female member of the Militants, she has a side ponytail and is the main zombie exterminator of the group. She has a kind-hearted nature, but is efficient in exterminating zombies. She considers another member of the Militants, Kougami, as a precious person and has been hinted to be pregnant. She is adept with a variety of weapons, usually using an ice pick or a similar short weapon.

Another member of the Militants. Nicknamed Ren, he uses a crossbow and is Shinou's lover.

Another member of the Militants.

Other characters

A girl who broadcasts on a pirate radio station in the hopes of reaching out to any survivors. Unfortunately, she succumbs to her infection before the School Living Club is able to reach her. She does, however, live long enough to leave a note behind explaining to any survivors that come across her hideout to take the keys to the hideout and motorhome, which the girls do.

Yuuri's little sister who is in elementary school. Yuuri seemingly rescues her from the elementary school after the School Living Club leaves their own school. In reality, Ruu is actually just Yuki's teddy bear that Yuuri deluded herself into thinking is her sister similar to Yuki's delusions of Megumi. The others from St. Isidore University and the School Living Club, including Yuki, were simply playing along to keep Yuuri happy and sane as they did for Yuki in the past. Yuuri eventually comes to terms with Ruu's death, giving the bear to Shinou for her baby.

Media

Manga
School-Live! is written by Nitroplus' Norimitsu Kaihō and illustrated by Sadoru Chiba. It began serialization on May 24, 2012, in the July issue of Houbunsha's Manga Time Kirara Forward magazine. The series went on hiatus between July and December 2017. It ended on November 22, 2019. Houbunsha published the first tankōbon volume on December 12, 2012, with the twelfth and final volume released on January 10, 2020. Yen Press began releasing the series in English in November 2015. Three manga anthologies illustrated by various artists have also been released, the first on July 13, 2015, the second on September 12, 2015, and the third on January 12, 2016.

A sequel manga series by Kaihō and Chiba, titled School-Live! Letters was serialized in Manga Time Kirara Forward from June 24, 2020 to August 24, 2021. Yen Press has also licensed the sequel manga.

Volumes

Anime
An anime television series was announced on June 21, 2014. The series was directed by Masaomi Ando at Lerche, with scripts by manga writer Norimitsu Kaihō and character design by Haruko Iikuza. The series aired in Japan between July 9, 2015 and September 24, 2015 and was simulcast by Crunchyroll. The series features four pieces of theme music; one opening theme and three ending themes. The series was licensed in North America by Sentai Filmworks and released on Blu-ray and DVD with an English dub on June 27, 2017. A drama CD based on the anime television series was released at Comiket 88 on August 14, 2015.

Episode list

Live-action film

A live-action film adaptation of School-Live! was announced in the January 2018 issue of Manga Time Kirara Forward in November 2017. The film was directed by Issei Shibata and stars the members of idol group Last Idol. It was released in Japan on January 25, 2019.

Other media
Yuki appeared as a support character in a fighting game called Nitroplus Blasterz: Heroines Infinite Duel, which was released in December 2015. She, along with the other characters, also appears in the 2017 mobile RPG, Kirara Fantasia.

Reception

Manga
The official Twitter account of Houbunsha's Manga Time Kirara magazines has announced that School-Live! has two million copies in print as of March 2017. The English release of the first three volumes were also included on the American Library Association's list of 2017 Great Graphic Novels for Teens, and the fifth and sixth volumes made the 2018 list. School-Live! was nominated for the 52nd Seiun Awards in the Best Comic category in 2021.

Anime
The first episode of the anime was well-received and sparked a ten-fold increase in manga sales. It was also viewed more than one million times on Niconico.

References

External links
 

2012 manga
2015 anime television series debuts
2015 Japanese television series endings
Apocalyptic anime and manga
Anime series based on manga
Fiction with unreliable narrators
Horror anime and manga
Houbunsha manga
Lerche (studio)
Madman Entertainment anime
Manga adapted into films
Manga adapted into television series
NBCUniversal Entertainment Japan
Nitroplus
Psychological thriller anime and manga
School life in anime and manga
Seinen manga
Sentai Filmworks
Slice of life anime and manga
Tokyo MX original programming
Yen Press titles
Zombies in anime and manga